Xylopolia is a moth genus in the family Noctuidae.

Species
 Xylopolia bella (Butler, 1881)
 Xylopolia fulvireniforma Chang, 1991

References
Natural History Museum Lepidoptera genus database
Xylopolia at funet

Orthosiini